Frederick Ranjan Manilal de Silva Gunatilleke (born 15 August 1951), or Ranjan Gunatilleke, is a former Sri Lankan cricketer who played one One Day International (ODI) in the 1979 Cricket World Cup. In September 2018, he was one of 49 former Sri Lankan cricketers honoured for their services before Sri Lanka became a full member of the International Cricket Council (ICC).

References

External links

1951 births
Living people
Sri Lankan cricketers
Sri Lanka One Day International cricketers
Cricketers at the 1979 Cricket World Cup